John Franklin Lofland (born 1936) is an American sociologist best known for his studies of the peace movement and for his first book, Doomsday Cult: A Study of Conversion, Proselytization, and Maintenance of Faith, which was based on field work among a group of Unification Church members in California in the 1960s. It is considered to be one of the most important and widely cited studies of the process of religious conversion, and one of the first modern sociological studies of a new religious movement.

Biography 
Lofland was born in Milford, Delaware, and attended Swarthmore College, Columbia University, and the University of California, Berkeley, where he earned a PhD in sociology based on his Unification Church study.  Since 1970 he has been a professor in the sociology department at the University of California, Davis, where he is now Emeritus Professor of Sociology .

In the 1970s, 1980s, and 1990s Lofland did field work among peace demonstrators in the United States and in Europe. He has undertaken administrative roles in several social science associations and contributed as an editor or associate editor to sociological publications.  He has also been active in community organizations in Davis, California.

Writings
 1966 Doomsday Cult: A Study of Conversion, Missionizing and Faith Maintenance, Prentice-Hall. 1977, Enlarged Edition, hardcover, Irvington; paperback edition, 1981.
 1969 Deviance and Identity, with the assistance of Lyn Lofland, Prentice-Hall.
 1971 Analyzing Social Settings: A Guide to Qualitative Observation and Analysis, Wadsworth. 1984, Second Edition, with Lyn H. Lofland. 1995, Third Edition, with Lyn H. Lofland. Japanese translation, 1997. Fourth Edition, with D. Snow & L. Anderson, process for 2004 publication.
 1976 Doing Social Life: The Qualitative Analysis of Human Interaction in Natural Settings, Wiley.
 1977 State Executions Viewed Historically and Sociologically, with H. Bleackley, Patterson Smith.
 1978 Interaction in Everyday Life: Social Strategies, editor, Sage.
 1982 Crowd Lobbying: An Emerging Tactic of Interest Group Influence in California, Univ. of California, Davis, Institute on Governmental Affairs. Symbolic Sit-ins: Protest Occupations at the California Capitol, with M. Fink, University Press of America.
 1985 Protest: Studies of Collective Behavior and Social Movements, Transaction. 1991, paperback edition.
 1990 Peace Action in the Eighties: Social Science Perspectives, co-editor with Sam Marullo, Rutgers.
 1991 Peace Movement Organizations and Activists: An Analytic Bibliography, co-edited with V.Johnson and P. Kato, Haworth.
 1993 Polite Protesters: The American Peace Movement of the 1980s, Syracuse.
 1996 Social Movement Organizations: Guide to Research on Insurgent Realities, Aldine de Gruyter.
 1999 Old North Davis: Guide to Walking a Traditional Neighborhood. Yolo County Historical Society.
 2000 Davis, California, 1910s–1940s, (with Phyllis Haig), Arcadia.J. Lofland, C. V. Winter, 2001 — 4
 2001 Handbook of Ethnography, co-editor with P. Atkinsion, M. Couch, L. Lofland, Sage.
 in process, Demolishing A Historic Hotel: A Documentary Socioiology of Preservation Failures.

See also
 Academic study of new religious movements
 Chicago school (sociology)

References

1936 births
20th-century American male writers
20th-century American non-fiction writers
20th-century social scientists
American anti-war activists
American sociologists
California State University faculty
Columbia University alumni
Living people
Pennsylvania National Guard personnel
Researchers of new religious movements and cults
Sociologists of deviance
Sociologists of religion
Swarthmore College alumni
Symbolic interactionism
UC Berkeley College of Letters and Science alumni
University of California, Davis faculty
University of Michigan faculty
Writers about activism and social change